John Pretyman (1753/1754 – 5 June 1817) was an Anglican priest, who served as Archdeacon of Lincoln from 1793 to 1817.
 
He was educated at Pembroke College, Cambridge, where he started in 1774 age 20; and ordained deacon on 15 March 1778 and priest on 8 June 1780. After a curacy at Rattlesden he was Rector of Shotley from  1784 until his death on 5 June 1817.

He died on 5 June 1817.

He is also recorded as a Prebend of Aylesbury.

References

1817 deaths
People educated at Charterhouse School
Alumni of Pembroke College, Cambridge
Archdeacons of Lincoln
People from Babergh District
Year of birth uncertain